Baby Boom is an American television sitcom based on the 1987 film of the same name, created by Nancy Meyers and Charles Shyer, and starring Kate Jackson. The pilot premiered on NBC on September 10, 1988, and the series aired from November 2, 1988, to July 13, 1989.

Sam Wanamaker and the baby twins Kristina and Michelle Kennedy reprised their roles from the film, but otherwise, the characters picked up from the original film were cast with new actors. J.C. Wiatt was played by Kate Jackson, Helga Von Haupt by Joy Behar and Charlotte Elkman by Susie Essman.

Cast
 Kate Jackson as J. C. Wiatt
 Sam Wanamaker as Fritz Curtis
 Michelle and Kristina Kennedy as Elizabeth
 Daniel Bardol as Ken Arrenberg
 Joy Behar as Helga Von Haupt
 Susie Essman as Charlotte Elkman
 Robyn Peterson as Arlene Mandell
 Jane Elliot as Julie
 Robin Thomas as Rob Marks

Production
At the insistence of series creators Nancy Meyers and Charles Shyer, the show was made without a laugh track. In December 1988, NBC announced that the series would go on hiatus after the December 21 episode. The network had planned on bring the show back after making certain "creative changes", but only one leftover episode aired in the summer of 1989.

Episodes
Eight episodes are registered with the United States Copyright Office.

References

External links
 

1980s American sitcoms
1988 American television series debuts
1989 American television series endings
English-language television shows
Live action television shows based on films
NBC original programming
Television series by MGM Television
Television shows set in New York City